Bargain may refer to:

Common meanings
 The process whereby buyer and seller agree the price of goods or services, see bargaining.
 An agreement to exchange goods at a price.
 A discounted price offered by the seller to attract buyers.
 On a stock exchange, an agreement to buy or sell shares.

Other uses
 "Bargain" (song), a song by The Who
 Bargain Hunt, a British television program
 Bargain Hunt (retail store), an American discount store chain
 A notorious spyware also known as Bargain Buddy

See also
 The Bargain (disambiguation)
 Contract (disambiguation)
 Deal (disambiguation)
 The Company (Prison Break) The Scylla Operation BArGaIn